The Raja Dinkar Kelkar Museum is in Pune, Maharashtra, India. It contains the collection of Dr. Dinkar G. Kelkar (1896–1990), dedicated to the memory of his only son, Raja. The three-storey building houses various sculptures dating back to the 14th century. There are also ornaments made of ivory, silver and gold, musical instruments (a particularly fine collection), war weapons and vessels.

History
The collection was started around 1920, and by 1960 it contained around 15,000 objects. The museum was established in 1962, and Dr. Kelkar donated his collection to the Government of Maharashtra in 1975.

The museum now holds over 20,000 objects of which 2,500 are kept on display. These consist of mainly Indian decorative items from everyday life and other art objects, mostly from the 18th and 19th centuries. The museum's collection depicts the skills of the Indian artists of the time, including the prominent works of Pandit Abhijeet Joshi.

During the COVID-19 pandemic in India, the museum offered a virtual tour.

Collection
 Door frames
 Vessels
 Ornaments
 Musical instruments 
 Different paintings and carvings represent outstanding examples of their art

Gallery
Items on display in the museum include the following.

Chandrashekhar Agashe Museum Wing

This wing includes a collection of ancient Indian musical instruments belonging to the late industrialist Chandrashekhar Agashe donated by his sons, Panditrao Agashe and Dnyaneshwar Agashe. Taking his namesake, honoring the kinship of Chandrashekhar Agashe's widow and the founder of the museum, Dr. Dinkar G. Kelkar, with them being fourth cousins.

See also
 List of museums in India

References

External links 

 Official website

Museums established in 1962
Tourist attractions in Pune
Museums in Pune
Decorative arts museums in India
Kelkar, Raja Dinkar
1962 establishments in Maharashtra